Jesse James (born September 14, 1989) is an American actor.

Early life
James was born in Palm Springs, California, the son of Jaime, a laboratory technician, and Shane James, an actor.

Career
James began his acting career in the 1997 film As Good as It Gets, a role for which he won the Hollywood Reporter Young Star award. His career continued with his role in the 2001 film Blow, as the child version of Johnny Depp's character, and Pearl Harbor, in which he played the young version of Ben Affleck's character. James acted in the 2004 film The Butterfly Effect as the young Tommy Miller and The Amityville Horror. His television work includes Life and In Plain Sight, and he has become involved in the independent film community with projects such as Exodus Fall and Hickory Nation. 

In 2008 James starred in and was an executive producer for the short film Manifest Destiny.

Filmography

Film
 As Good as It Gets (1997) – Spencer Connelly
 Gods and Monsters (1998) – Michael Boone
 The Gingerbread Man (1998) – Jeff
 Puppies for Sale (1998) – Customer
 Sorrow's Child (1998) – Matt
 Message in a Bottle (1999) – Jason Osborne
 A Dog of Flanders (1999) – Young Nello
 Hanging Up (2000) – Jesse Marks
 Bailey's Mistake (2001, TV) – Dylan Donovan
 Blow (2001) – Young George Jung
 Pearl Harbor (2001) – Young Rafe McCawley
 Fear of the Dark (2002) – Ryan Billings
 Slap Her... She's French (2002) – Randolph Grady
 The Butterfly Effect (2004) – Tommy Miller at 13
 The Amityville Horror (2005) – Billy Lutz
 The Darkroom (2006) – J-Dawg
 The Flyboys (2008) – Jason McIntyre
 Jumper (2008) – young Mark Kobold
 Bones (2010) – Derrick Scott
 Exodus Fall (2010) – Kenneth Minor
 The Last Ride (2012) – Silas
 Hickory Nation (2012)
 Dead Souls (2012) – Johnny Petrie
 Wishin' and Hopin' (2014) – Chino
 The Lucky Man (2018) – Rev. Johnny Jones

Television
Walker, Texas Ranger ("Last of The Breed", parts 1 and 2, 1997) – Jebb Wilson
ER ("Good Luck, Ruth Johnson", 1998) – Wilson Geary
The X-Files ("The Unnatural", 1999) – Poor boy
The Wild Thornberrys ("Chimp Off the Old Block", 1999) – Gola
Angel ("I've Got You Under My Skin", 2000) – Ryan
Felicity ("Party Lines", 2000) – Stephen
Chicago Hope ("Hopes of You", 2000) – Dustin Moss
Family Law ("Celano v. Foster", 2002) – Jake Shaw
Monk ("Mr. Monk and the Captain's Wife", 2004) – Jared Stottlemeyer
Veronica Mars ("Papa's Cabin", 2007) – J.D. Sansone
In Plain Sight ("A Stand-Up Triple", 2009) – Tripp Sullivan
The Mentalist ("Red Menace", 2009) – Lucas Hodge
 Mad Men (The Doorway, part 2, 2013) - Zal

References

External links

1989 births
Living people
Male actors from California
American male child actors
American male film actors
American male television actors
20th-century American male actors
21st-century American male actors